Smear Lake is a lake in Bayfield County, Wisconsin, in the United States.

See also
List of lakes in Wisconsin

References

Lakes of Bayfield County, Wisconsin